This is a list of episodes for the tenth season (1959–60) of the television version of The Jack Benny Program.

Episodes

References
 
 

1959 American television seasons
1960 American television seasons
Jack 10